The Pipistrel WATTsUP is an electric aircraft proof-of-concept trainer design that was built in Slovenia by Pipistrel.

The aircraft is based upon the Pipistrel Alpha Trainer, which was itself related to the Pipistrel Sinus and Virus designs. The WATTsUP was first publicly shown at the Salon de Blois airshow, in France on 30 August 2014.

The proof of concept resulted in the Pipistrel Alpha Electro production aircraft.

Design and development
The WATTsUP is a high-wing, cantilever monoplane of pod-and-boom configuration with a T-tail. The cabin has two seats in side-by-side configuration. The WATTsUP is powered by an  electric motor developed by Siemens AG, that weighs just . The initial climb rate is over 5.1 m/s (1,000 ft/min).

The manufacturer claims the electric motor produces more power than a Rotax 912 and can be fully charged in about one hour. The airplane is expected to be capable of flying for about one hour with a 30-minute reserve and it is most efficient in the traffic pattern where as much as 13 percent of the energy is recuperated during each approach.

The initial base price is intended to be less than 100,000 Euros.

Specifications (WATTsUP)

See also 
 Aero Electric Sun Flyer
 Liaoning Ruixiang RX1E

References

External links

Electric aircraft
Pipistrel aircraft
Single-engined tractor aircraft
High-wing aircraft
Aircraft first flown in 2014